The 2017–18 Canberra United FC season was the club's tenth season in the W-League, the premier competition for women's football. The team played home games at McKellar Park. The club was managed by Heather Garriock.

Players

Squad information

Transfers in

Transfers out

Contract extensions

Managerial staff
Current as of 30 January 2017

Squad statistics

|-
|colspan="14"|Players no longer at the club:

Competitions

W-League

League table

Results summary

Results by round

Fixtures
 Click here for season fixtures.

References

External links
 Official Website

Canberra United FC seasons
Canberra United